Henriqueta Galeno (Fortaleza, February 23, 1887 - Fortaleza, September 10, 1964), was a Brazilian lawyer, writer and teacher.

Early life 
In 1919, she founded and directed the Salon Juvenal Galeno, which was Ceará's main cultural development center. She created and installed the Center of Studies of Juvenal Galeno, the Feminine Wing and the publishing house Henriqueta Galeno. She was an active voice in the struggle for Brazilian women to have the right to vote.

References

1887 births
1964 deaths
Brazilian women lawyers
20th-century Brazilian lawyers
20th-century women lawyers